was the tenth and final vessel of ten s, and the fourth to be built for the Imperial Japanese Navy under the Circle Two Program (Maru Ni Keikaku).

History
Despite being one of the most powerful classes of destroyers in the world at the time of their completion, none survived the Pacific War.
Suzukaze, built at the Uraga Dock Company was laid down on 9 July 1935, launched on 11 March 1937 and commissioned on 31 August 1937.

Operational history
From January 1942, Suzukaze participated in operations in the Netherlands East Indies, including the invasion of Tarakan Island. She was later assigned to patrols of Staring Bay in the Sulawesi, where she was torpedoed on 4 February 1942 by the submarine . The resultant explosion killed nine crewmen and caused extensive damage, requiring a return to Sasebo Naval Arsenal at the end of March for repairs.

Suzukaze was reassigned to the IJN 1st Fleet on 10 April, and back to the IJN 2nd Fleet on 14 June. In mid-August, she returned to active duty, escorting the aircraft carrier  to Truk and continuing on to join the rest of the fleet at Guadalcanal. After the Battle of the Eastern Solomons on 28 August, she escorted the damaged cruiser  back to Truk. In the remainder of August through early November, Suzukaze participated in twelve "Tokyo Express" high speed transport runs or surface attack missions to Guadalcanal, as well as participating briefly in the Battle of the Santa Cruz Islands on 26 October under Admiral Nobutake Kondō. During the First Naval Battle of Guadalcanal on the night of 12–13 November 1942, Suzukaze rescued 1100 survivors from the torpedoed transport Naka Maru. For the rest of the month, Suzukaze patrolled between Shortland Island, Buna and Rabaul. During the Battle of Tassafaronga on 30 November, Suzukaze barely avoided being struck by a salvo of torpedoes fired from the American destroyer .

In December 1942, Suzukaze continued in transport operations to Guadalcanal, suffering from minor damage in an air raid on 1 January 1943, necessitating repairs at Truk at the end of the month, and return to Sasebo in February. During the Battle of Kula Gulf on 5–6 July, Suzukaze assisted in sinking the cruiser , taking a number of hits in return which disabled her forward guns. After repairs at Yokosuka in late July, Suzukaze was assigned to escort missions between the Japanese home islands and Truk until early November. During a refit at Sasebo at the end of November, her “X” turret was removed and replaced by additional Type 96 anti-aircraft guns. From the end of December to end of January 1944, Suzukaze escorted numerous convoys to Truk and Ponape. She was removed from the navy list on 10 March 1944.

Notes

References

External links

Shiratsuyu-class destroyers
World War II destroyers of Japan
World War II shipwrecks in the Pacific Ocean
Ships built by Uraga Dock Company
Ships sunk by American submarines
1937 ships
Maritime incidents in January 1944